Year 1374 (MCCCLXXIV) was a common year starting on Sunday (link will display the full calendar) of the Julian calendar.

Events 
 January–December 
 April 23 – In recognition of his services, Edward III of England grants the English writer Geoffrey Chaucer a gallon of wine a day, for the rest of his life.
 June 24 – The illness dancing mania begins in Aix-la-Chapelle (Aachen), possibly due to ergotism.
 October 27 – King Gongmin of Goryeo is assassinated and succeeded by U of Goryeo on the throne of Goryeo (in modern-day Korea).
 November 25 – James of Baux succeeds his uncle, Philip II, as Prince of Taranto (modern-day eastern Italy) and titular ruler of the Latin Empire (northern Greece and western Turkey).

 Date unknown 
 Rao Biram Dev succeeds Rao Kanhadev as ruler of Marwar (the modern-day Jodhpur district of India).
 Shaikh Hasan Jalayir succeeds his father, Shaykh Uways Jalayir, as ruler of the Jalayirid Sultanate in modern-day Iraq and western Iran. Hasan proves to be an unpopular ruler and is executed on October 9 and succeeded by his brother, Shaikh Hussain Jalayir.
 Musa II succeeds his father, Mari Djata II, as Mansa of the Mali Empire (modern-day Mali and Senegal).
 Robert de Juilly succeeds Raymond Berenger as Grand Master of the Knights Hospitaller.
 Princes from the Kingdom of Granada choose Abu al-Abbas Ahmad to succeed Muhammad as-Said, as Sultan of the Marinid Empire in Morocco. The Empire is split into the Kingdom of Fez and the Kingdom of Marrakech.
 A form of the Great Plague returns to Europe.
 The Château de Compiègne royal residence is built in France.

Births 
 April 11 – Roger Mortimer, 4th Earl of March, heir to the throne of England (d. 1398)
 November 26 – Yury Dmitrievich, Russian grand prince (d. 1434)
 probable
 Queen Jadwiga of Poland
 King Martin I of Sicily (d. 1409)

Deaths 
 March 12 – Emperor Go-Kōgon of Japan (b. 1338).
 June 5 or June 6 – William Whittlesey, Archbishop of Canterbury
 June 29 – Jan Milíč of Kroměříž, Czech priest and reformer
 July 19 – Petrarch, Italian poet (b. 1304)
 September – Joanna of Flanders, Duchess of Brittany (b. 1295)
 October 27 – King Gongmin of Goryeo (b. 1330)
 November 25 – Prince Philip II of Taranto
 December 1 – Magnus Ericson, king of Sweden (b. 1316)
 date unknown – Gao Qi, Chinese poet (born 1336)
 date unknown – Konrad of Megenberg, historian (b. 1309)

References